Prophets of Science Fiction is an American documentary television series produced and hosted by Ridley Scott for the Science Channel.

The series covers the life and work of leading science fiction authors of the last couple of centuries. It depicts how they predicted and, accordingly, influenced the development of scientific advancements by inspiring many readers to assist in transforming those futuristic visions into everyday reality. The stories are told through film clips, reenactments, illustrations and interviews.

The first episode received mixed reviews. Commentators appreciated the approach of combining coverage of contemporary scientific research and biographical exposition,  but criticized the series as "light on the substance and heavy on the exaggeration". The series' attempts to link Mary Shelley's Frankenstein to developments such as organ transplants, supercomputers and DNA research were described by one critic as far-fetched but by another as successful.

List of episodes
The series' first season consists of 8 one-hour episodes which aired on the Science Channel in November 2011 and February 2012.

References

External links

English-language television shows
2010s American documentary television series
2011 American television series debuts
Science Channel original programming
Science fiction studies